Tapas Banerjee is an Indian advocate and politician from West Bengal belonging to All India Trinamool Congress. He was a member of the West Bengal Legislative Assembly representing Asansol Dakshin (Vidhan Sabha constituency) from 2011 to 2021.

He graduated with  B.Com & LLB from University of Calcutta. He was elected as a member the West Bengal Legislative Assembly from  Asansol Dakshin in 2011 and 2016.

Political career
Tapas Banerjee won Asansol Dakshin (Vidhan Sabha constituency) in the 2011 assembly elections. Banerjee defeated his nearest contender, Ashok Kumar Mukherjee of  CPI(M), with a margin of 28,541 votes. Banerjee received 89,645 votes, while the runner-up Mukherjee, got 61,104. The voter turnout in the election was 78.69%.

References

Living people
Indian lawyers
Trinamool Congress politicians from West Bengal
West Bengal MLAs 2011–2016
West Bengal MLAs 2016–2021
People from Paschim Bardhaman district
Year of birth missing (living people)
University of Calcutta alumni